The 1952 Kansas gubernatorial election was held on November 4, 1952. Incumbent Republican Edward F. Arn defeated Democratic nominee Charles Rooney with 56.34% of the vote.

Primary elections
Primary elections were held on August 5, 1952.

Democratic primary

Candidates 
Charles Rooney
Robert G. Martin
David S. Downing
Henry D. Parkinson
Ewell Stewart

Results

General election

Candidates
Major party candidates 
Edward F. Arn, Republican
Charles Rooney, Democratic

Other candidates
David C. White, Prohibition
W. W. Tamplin, Socialist

Results

References

1952
Kansas
Gubernatorial